State Route 277 (SR 277) is a  state highway in the northern part of the U.S. state of Alabama, traveling along part of former U.S. Route 72 (US 72) in Jackson County.

History

Upon completion of the present US 72 expressway in the 1990s, the old road was given to the county and cities of Stevenson and Bridgeport to maintain as County Road 74 (CR 74), but the local governments convinced the state to take back the road, which was redesignated SR 277 in March 2003.

County leaders and city leaders in Bridgeport and Stevenson were not happy about the road being their responsibility and turned down requests to take the road back several times. The roadway has many bridges and is designed in such a way that maintenance of the road was deemed too expensive for Jackson County. After a large effort by the county and local state legislators to get the route back under state control, ALDOT reluctantly took back the highway as SR 277, insisting that they would swap mileage with SR 35 west of Scottsboro. However, that mileage swap never occurred and SR 35 west of Scottsboro remains a state-controlled highway.

SR 277 does not include all of former US 72.

SR 277 travels on the original Memphis and Charleston Railroad bed.

Major intersections

References

277
Transportation in Jackson County, Alabama
U.S. Route 72